Caroline Anderson is the pseudonym by Caroline M. Woolnough (born British Hong Kong) is a popular British writer of over 80 contemporary romance novels to Mills & Boon (or Harlequin Enterprises Ltd) since 1991. She specializes in medical romances.
Before writing, she has been a nurse, a secretary, a teacher, and has run her own business. Married with John, they had two sisters: Sarah and Hannah, and lived in Suffolk, England.

Bibliography

Single Novels
Practice Makes Perfect,	1991/12
Saving Dr. Gregory,	1992/04
A Gentle Giant,	1992/06
Just What the Doctor Ordered,	1993/05
Picking Up the Pieces,	1994/02
Once More, With Feeling,	1994/12
Role Play,	1995/02
Taken For Granted,	1995/05
A Familiar Stranger,	1995/08
One Step at a Time,	1996/01
The Teapot Trail: A Taste of Cumbria,	1996/01
Just Another Miracle!,	1998/02
That Forever Feeling,	1998/02
A Funny Thing Happened...,	1999/01
Kids Included!,	1999/06
Practically Perfect,	1999/10
Just Say Yes!,	2000/04
Making Memories,	2000/06
Give Me Forever,	2000/12
Rescuing Dr. Ryan,	2001/02
A Special Kind of Woman, 2001/08
A Very Single Woman,	2002/04
An unexpected Bonus,	2003/10
For Christmas, For Always,	2003/10
A Special Kind of Woman,	2008
Their Christmas Family Miracle,	2009

The Audley Memorial Hospital Series
Relative Ethics,	1991/11
More than Time,	1992/06
A Perfect Hero,	1992/08
Playing the Joker,	1992/12
Raw Deal,	1993/01
Knave of Hearts,	1993/02
Second Thoughts,	1993/10
The Spice of Life,	1993/10
A Man of honour,	1994/03
Anyone Can Dream,	1994/12
Love Without Measure,	1995/07
That's My Baby!,	1995/12
And Daughter Makes Three,	1996/01
Tender Touch,	1996/05
The Real Fantasy,	1996/08
The Ideal Choice,	1996/09
If You Need Me...,	1997/02
Not Husband Material!,	1997/04
The Perfect Wife and Mother?,	1997/05
Definitely Maybe,	1998/06
Sarah's Gift,	1999/01
The Girl Next Door,	2000/03
Just a Family Doctor,	2000/10
A Mother by Nature,	2000/12
Accidental Rendezvous,	2001/07
The Perfect Christmas,	2001/10
Accidental Seduction,	2002/06
The Baby Bonding,	2003/08
Assignment: Christmas,	2004/10
Holding Out for a Hero,	2005/06
Maternal Instinct,	2006/04
A Wife and Child to Cherish,	2006/12
His Very Own Wife and Child,	2007/02
A Mummy for Christmas = A Mommy for Christmas,	2008/10

Assignment: Double Destiny
Double Destiny,	2002/09
Assignment: Single Man,	2002/09
Assignment: Single Father,	2002/10

Yoxburgh Series
The Tycoon's Instant Family,	2006/09
Caring for His Baby,	2007/09
His Pregnant Housekeeper,	2008/03
The Single Mum And The Tycoon = The Single Mom And The Tycoon,	2008/10

Kids & Kisses Series Multi-Author
Love Without Measure,	1995/07
The Ideal Choice,	1996/09

Christmas is for Kids Series Multi-Author
A Very Special Need,	1997/10

Changing Places Series Multi-Author
Captive Heart,	1998/08

Bundles of Joy Series Multi-Author
An Unexpected Bonus,	1999/04

Ready for Baby Series Multi-Author
Delivered: One Family,	2000/09
The Pregnant Tycoon,	2004/03
The Baby From Nowhere = The Pregnancy Surprise,	2004/07
A pregnancy Surprise,	2004/12

St Elizabeth's Children's Hospital Series Multi-Author
12. Angel's Christmas,	2001/04

Nearlyweds Series Multi-Author
The Impetuous Bride,	2001/04

Maybe Baby! Series Multi-Author
The Baby Question,	2002/01

What Women Want! Series Multi-Author
With This Baby..., 	2003/05

Heartbeat Series Multi-Author
Chemical Reaction,	2003/08

Tango Series Multi-Author
The Baby Bonding,	2003/08

Heart to Heart Series Multi-Author
A Bride Worth Waiting For,	2005/11

Baby On Board Series Multi-Author
The Tycoon's Instant Family,	2006
His Pregnant Housekeeper,	2008

Heart to Heart Multi-Author
Caring for His Baby,	2007/09

Brides of Penhally Bay Series Multi-Author
Christmas-Eve Baby,	2007
The Rebel of Penhally Bay,	2009

Diamond Brides Series Multi-Author
Two Little Miracles,	2008

Brides of Penhally Bay Multi-Author
Their Miracle Baby,	2008

Billionaire Doctors Multi-Author
The Valtieri Marriage Deal,	2009

Omnibus In Collaboration
Marrying a Doctor (2001) (Betty Neels)
Prescription Pregnancy (2001) (Marion Lennox and Josie Metcalfe)
Island Pleasures (2002/04) (Susan Napier)
Live the Emotion (2003/07) (Adrianne Lee and Julia Byrne)
The Pregnancy Surprise (2003) (Emma Darcy and Gayle Wilson)
Angel's Christmas by Anderson with Nice and Easy by (Josie Metcalfe (2004)
Christmas Deliveries (2004) (Josie Metcalfe and Sarah Morgan)
It Takes a Hero (2005/08) (Carol Marinelli with Sarah Morgan)
The Mills and Boon Collection (2006) (Penny Jordan with Margaret Way)
Christmas Treasures (2006) (Betty Neels and Helen Brooks)
Whose Baby? (2007) (Lucy Gordon and Jessica Hart)

References and sources

Caroline Anderson at eHarlequin

External links
Caroline Anderson´s Spanish ebooks
Caroline Anderson at Fantastic Fiction

20th-century English novelists
21st-century English novelists
British romantic fiction writers
Living people
English women novelists
Women romantic fiction writers
21st-century English women writers
20th-century English women writers
1939 births